Red Rain is a 2013 Indian Malayalam-language science fiction thriller film written and directed by Rahul Sadasivan.
It stars  Narain, Mohan Sharma, Tini Tom, Shari, Leona Lishoy, Andrea Fortis, and Sergio Kalei.  Red Rain  was produced by Sachin Sadasivan under the banner Highlands Entertainment and released theatrically in India on 6 December 2013. The film is loosely based on the Kerala red rain phenomenon.

Synopsis
A young scientist investigates a series of mysterious events such as the unexpected deaths of cattle and bright lights in the sky. He becomes convinced that they are caused by extraterrestrial life-forms.

Cast
 Narain as Jay
 Mohan Sharma as Professor
 Rubia as Victim
 Shari as Victim's mother
 Sachin Sadasivan as Jay's brother
 Tini Tom as Reporter
 Andrea Fortis as Andrea
 Sergio Kalei as Sergio
 Vishnu Warrier as Neel
 Leona Lishoy as Neha
 Adinad Sasi as Witness

See also
 List of Malayalam horror films

References

External links
 

2013 films
2010s Malayalam-language films